Carex bohemica is a species of sedge (genus Carex), native to Europe, Siberia, and northern Asia to Japan. It prefers to grow in mud flats.

References

bohemica
Plants described in 1772